Malakoff High School is a public high school located in Malakoff, Texas (USA) and classified as a 3A school by the UIL.  It is part of the Malakoff Independent School District located in western Henderson County.  In 2015, the school was rated "Met Standard" by the Texas Education Agency.

Athletics
The Malakoff Tigers compete in these sports - 

Cross Country, Volleyball, Football, Basketball, Powerlifting, Golf, Tennis, Track, Softball & Baseball

State Champion
Baseball- 
2021 (3A)

State Finalist
Volleyball – 
1969 (1A)
Football –
2018 (3A)

References

External links
Malakoff ISD

Schools in Henderson County, Texas
Public high schools in Texas